The Legitimists are royalists who adhere to the rights of dynastic succession to the French crown of the descendants of the eldest branch of the Bourbon dynasty, which was overthrown in the 1830 July Revolution. They reject the claim of the July Monarchy of 1830–1848 which placed Louis Philippe, Duke of Orléans, head of the Orléans cadet branch of the Bourbon dynasty, on the throne until he too was dethroned and driven with his family into exile.

Following the movement of Ultra-royalists during the Bourbon Restoration of 1814, Legitimists came to form one of the three main right-wing factions in France, which was principally characterized by its counter-revolutionary views. According to historian René Rémond, the other two right-wing factions were the Orléanists and the Bonapartists.

Legitimists believe that the traditional rules of succession, based on the Salic law, determine the rightful King of France. The last ruling king whom legitimists acknowledge as legitimate was Charles X, and when the line of his heirs became extinct in 1883 with the death of his grandson Henri, Count of Chambord, the most senior heir to the throne under these traditional rules was Infante Juan, Count of Montizón, a descendant of Louis XIV through his grandson Philip V of Spain. The fact that all French Legitimist claimants since 1883 have been members of the Spanish royal dynasty, the allegation that their patrilineal descent from Louis XIV has been in question since 1936, and the belief that Philip V renounced claims to the French throne for himself and his heirs-male in the Treaty of Utrecht, are all irrelevant to Legitimism; however, these facts have prompted other French monarchists to pivot to support of the Orléans line, who would be next in the traditional line of succession if Philip's heirs were excluded, or support to the Bonaparte family.

The current Legitimist pretender is Prince Louis, Duke of Anjou, the senior great-grandson of Alfonso XIII of Spain by male primogeniture, whose line was excluded from the Spanish succession.

History

Bourbon Restoration (1814–1830) 

Following the Bourbon Restoration in 1814, a strongly restricted census suffrage sent to the Chamber of Deputies an Ultra-royalist majority in 1815–1816 (la Chambre introuvable) and from 1824 to 1827. Called as such because they were more royalist than the king (plus royalistes que le roi), the Ultras were thus the dominant political faction under Louis XVIII (1815–1824) and Charles X (1824–1830). Opposed to the constitutional monarchy of Louis XVIII and to the limitation of the sovereign's power, they hoped to restore the Ancien Régime and cancel the rupture created by the French Revolution. By the same token, Ultras opposed all liberal, republican and democratic ideas. While Louis XVIII hoped to moderate the restoration of the Ancien Régime in order to make it acceptable to the population, the Ultras would never abandon the dream of an integral restoration even after the 1830 July Revolution which set the Orléanist branch on the throne and sent the Ultras back to their castles in the countryside and to private life. Their importance during the Restoration was in part due to electoral laws which largely favored them (on one hand a Chamber of Peers composed of hereditary members and on the other a Chamber of Deputies elected under a heavily restricted census suffrage which permitted approximately 100,000 Frenchmen to vote).

Louis XVIII's first ministers, who included Charles Maurice de Talleyrand-Périgord, Armand-Emmanuel de Vignerot du Plessis, duc de Richelieu and Élie, duc Decazes, were replaced by the Chambre introuvable dominated by the Ultras. Louis XVIII finally decided to dissolve this chaotic assembly, but the new liberals who replaced them were no easier to govern. After the 1820 assassination of Charles Ferdinand, Duke of Berry, the ultra-reactionary son of the comte d'Artois (Louis XVIII's brother and future Charles X) and a short interval during which Richelieu governed, the Ultras were back in government headed by the Jean-Baptiste de Villèle.

The death in 1824 of the moderate Louis XVIII emboldened the Ultra faction. In January 1825, Villèle's government passed the Anti-Sacrilege Act which punished by death the theft of sacred vessels (with or without consecrated hosts). This anachronistic law (Jean-Noël Jeanneney) was in the end never applied (except on a minor point) and repealed in the first months of Louis Philippe I's reign (1830–1848). The Ultras also wanted to create courts to punish radicals and passed laws restricting freedom of the press.

After the 1830 July Revolution replaced the Bourbons with the more liberal Orléanist branch, the Ultras' influence declined, although it survived until at least the 16 May 1877 crisis and 1879 and perhaps even longer. They softened their views and made the restoration of the House of Bourbon their main aim. From 1830 on, they became known as Legitimists.

Legitimists under the July Monarchy (1830–1848) 
During the July Monarchy of 1830 to 1848, when the junior Orléanist branch held the throne, the Legitimists were politically marginalized, many withdrawing from active participation in political life. The situation was complicated before 1844 by debate as to who the legitimate king was, as Charles X and his son Louis-Antoine d'Angoulême, Dauphin of France had both abdicated during the 1830 Revolution in favor of Charles's young grandson, Henri, Count of Chambord. Until the deaths of Charles X and his son in 1836 and 1844, respectively, many Legitimists continued to recognize each of them in turn as the rightful king, ahead of Chambord.

Legitimists under the Second Republic and the Second Empire (1848–1871) 
The fall of King Louis Philippe I in 1848 led to a strengthening of the Legitimist position. Although the childlessness of Chambord weakened the hand of the Legitimists, they came back into political prominence during the Second Republic. Legitimists joined with Orleanists to form the Party of Order which dominated parliament from the elections of May 1849 until Bonaparte's coup on 2 December 1851. They formed a prominent part of Odilon Barrot's ministry from December 1848 to November 1849 and in 1850 were successful in passing the Falloux Law which brought the Catholic Church back into secondary education.

Through much of this time there was discussion of fusion with the Orléanist party so that the two could effect a monarchical restoration. This prospect prompted several sons of Louis Philippe to declare their support for Chambord, but fusion was not actually achieved, and after 1850 the two parties again diverged. The most committed Orléanists supported the candidacy of Louis Philippe's third son, François d'Orléans, Prince of Joinville, for the presidency while the Legitimists largely supported allowing Louis-Napoléon Bonaparte to run for a second term. In spite of this support for Bonaparte's ambitions, they opposed his scheme to restore universal suffrage in the last months of 1851, and their leaders, like those of the Orléanists, were arrested during Bonaparte's coup.

The period of the Second Empire saw the Legitimists once again cast out of active political life.

Legitimists under the Third Republic (1871–1940) 
Nevertheless, the Legitimists remained a significant party within elite opinion, attracting support of the larger part of the Ancien Régime aristocracy. After the Siege of Paris in 1870 and the 1871 Paris Commune, the Legitimists returned for one final time to political prominence. The 8 February 1871 election, held under universal manhood suffrage, gave the National Assembly a royalist majority supported by the provinces while all the Parisian deputies were republican. This time the Legitimists were able to agree with the Orléanists on a program of fusion largely because of the growing likelihood that the Chambord would die without children. The liberal Orléanists agreed to recognize Chambord as king and the Orléanists claimant himself Prince Philippe, Count of Paris (1838–1894) recognized Chambord as head of the French royal house. In return, Legitimists in the Assembly agreed that should Chambord die childless, Philippe d'Orléans would succeed him as king. Unfortunately for French monarchism, Chambord's refusal to accept the tricolor as the flag of France and to abandon the fleur-de-lys, symbol of the Ancien Régime, made restoration impossible until after his death in 1883, by which time the monarchists had long since lost their parliamentary majority due to the 16 May 1877 crisis. The death of Chambord effectively dissolved the Legitimists as a political force in France.

Affected by sinistrisme, few conservatives explicitly called themselves right-wing during the Third Republic as it became a term associated with the counter-revolution and anti-republican feelings and by the 1900s was reserved for reactionary groups. Those Legitimists who had rallied to the Republic in 1893, after Chambord's death ten years before still called themselves Droite constitutionnelle or républicaine (Constitutional or Republican Right). However, they changed their name in 1899 and entered the 1902 elections under the name Action libérale (Liberal Action). By 1910, the only group which openly claimed descent from the right-wing gathered only nostalgic royalists and from 1924 on the term right-wing practically vanished from the parliamentary right's glossary.

By this time, the vast majority of Legitimists had retired to their country chateaux and abandoned the political arena. Although the Action française (French Action) remained an influential movement throughout the 1930s, its motivations for the restoration of monarchy were quite distinct from older Legitimists' views and Charles Maurras' instrumental use of Catholicism set them at odds. Thus, Legitimists participated little in the political events of the 1920s and 1930s, in particular in the 6 February 1934 riots organized by far-right leagues. The royalist aristocrats clearly distinguished themselves from the new ultra right which was influenced by the emerging movements of fascism and Nazism. However, Legitimists joined Maurras in celebrating the fall of the Third Republic after the 1940 Battle of France as a divine surprise and many of them entered Philippe Pétain's Vichy administration, seeing a golden opportunity to impose a reactionary program in occupied France.

Legitimists under Vichy and after World War II (1940–present) 
French royalism largely receded to irrelevance in World War II and beyond.  While before World War II, many French conservatives and other members of the right also harbored royalist aspirations, conservative movements dropped this platform during and after the war.  Charles de Gaulle's center-rightist Gaullism explicitly repudiated monarchism, and far-right organizations disdained the old aristocratic elite.  According to historian René Rémond's studies of right-wing factions in France, Legitimists strongly supported the Vichy regime; nevertheless, they received little from the Vichy government, and the regime emphasized Catholic traditionalism rather than a return to aristocracy.  According to Rémond, Marcel Lefebvre's Society of Saint Pius X, founded in 1970, shares aspects with the Legitimist movement.  Nevertheless, Legitimism is a largely spent force.

Spanish Bourbons 

A remnant of Legitimists, known as the Blancs d'Espagne (Whites of Spain), by repudiating Philip V's renunciation of the French throne as ultra vires and contrary to the fundamental French monarchical law, upheld the rights of the eldest branch of the Bourbons, represented as of 1883 by the Carlist pretender to the Spanish throne. This group was initially minuscule, but it began to grow larger after World War II due both to the political leftism of the Orléanist pretender Henri, Count of Paris and to the active efforts of the claimants of the elder line after extinction of the Carlist male-line—Infante Jaime, Duke of Segovia, the disinherited second son of Alfonso XIII of Spain; and his son Prince Alphonse, Duke of Anjou—to secure Legitimist support, such that by the 1980s the elder line had fully reclaimed for its supporters the political title of Legitimists.

The Spanish-born Prince Louis, Duke of Anjou is the Bourbon whom the French Legitimists consider to be the de jure king of France under the name Louis XX. A 1987 attempt by the Orléanist heir (and other Bourbons, none of the elder branch) to contest Louis-Alphonse's use of the Anjou title and to deny him use of the plain coat of arms of France was dismissed by the French courts in March 1989 for lack of jurisdiction (the courts did not address the merits of the claims). He is a French citizen through his paternal grandmother and is generally recognised as the senior legitimate representative of the House of Capet.

Dynastic arguments 

Legitimists consider the valid rationale for restoration and the order of succession to the French throne derives from fundamental laws of the Ancien Régime, which were formed in the early centuries of the Capetian monarchy.

According to these rules, monarchy is the basic form of government and the monarch the indispensable executive of government, succession to the throne being hereditary and passing by Salic primogeniture. Thus, females and any male who is not the premier né (i.e. the legitimate eldest descendant of the most senior Capetian line) are excluded from the throne. The king must also be Catholic.

Other tenets of the legitimist position are the following:
 Continuity (or immediacy) of the crown as upon the death of a monarch his heir automatically and immediately becomes king without the need of any formal act of investiture and even if political circumstances would not allow him to actually take power.
 Unavailability (or inalienability) of the crown as it is not the personal property of the king, therefore nobody, not even the king himself, can alter the line of succession by abdication, renunciation, or appointment of an heir of his own choosing. This argument is crucial for Legitimists regarding the continuing validity of the rights of succession of the Spanish line of Philip V and his descendants. According to this view, Philip's renunciation of his rights of succession to the French throne in the Treaty of Utrecht of 1713 was null and void and therefore his descendants still retain their claim to the French throne ahead of the Orléans line.

It has been a point of contention within the Legitimist camp to what extent French nationality constitutes a precondition for royal succession. While adherents of the Spanish Anjou line argue that princes of foreign nationality can still succeed to the French crown, others hold that French nationality of both the claimant and his ancestors is a requirement.

List of Legitimist claimants to the French throne 
In the 1870s the rival Legitimist and Orléanist claimants agreed for the sake of restoration of the monarchy in France to end their rivalry. Philippe d'Orléans, Count of Paris and grandson of Louis Philippe I, accepted the prior claim to the throne of Chambord, who remained childless; Chambord in turn acknowledged that Philippe would claim the right to succeed him as heir, and after his death many Legitimists accepted the descendants of Philippe as the rightful pretenders and became known as Unionists.

Those Legitimists who did not accept the Orléanist line as the successors of Chambord argued that the renunciation of the French throne by Philip V of Spain, second grandson of Louis XIV, was invalid and that in 1883 (when Chambord died childless) the throne passed by right to Philip V's heirs in the male-line. In 1883, the senior male of the Spanish branch of Bourbons was Infante Juan, Count of Montizón. His father, Infante Carlos, Count of Molina (second son of Charles IV: grandson of Philip V), had lost Spain's throne in favor of his niece, the non-Salic heiress of his elder brother, Isabella II and his lineage became known as the Carlist pretenders in Spain.

When the Carlist branch died out in 1936, the French claim was reunited with that of the Isabelline Spanish line through her grandson Alfonso XIII of Spain, who was also (officially) the grandson of her consort Francisco de Asís, Duke of Cádiz (grandson Charles IV via his third son, Infante Francisco de Paula of Spain) and thus the most senior male-line descendant of Philip V (although by that time Alfonso had been dethroned by the Second Spanish Republic). The French and Spanish claims separated again at Alfonso's death as his eldest surviving son Infante Jaime, Duke of Segovia renounced his claim to the Spanish throne due to physical disability and some years later asserted a claim to the French succession based on Legitimist principles. The present French Legitimist claimant descends from Jaime while the present king of Spain descends from his younger brother Don Juan.

There are however some legitimists who have questioned the claims of all pretenders from Alfonso XIII onward, as it is commonly believed that his father, Alfonso XII, was not the biological son of the Duke of Cadiz. If true, this would mean that Francisco de Borbón y Escasany, 5th Duke of Seville (great-great grandson of Cádiz's younger brother) is currently the true legitimist heir to the French throne.

Line of Succession

The annotated list below covers the first part of this line of succession, being limited to descendants of King Louis XIV. People named in italics are unnumbered because they are deceased.

  King Louis XIV of France (1638-1715)
 Louis, Grand Dauphin (1661-1711)
 Louis, Duke of Burgundy (1682-1712)
  King Louis XV of France (1710-1774)
 Louis, Dauphin of France (1729-1765)
  King Louis XVI of France (1754-1793)
  Louis, Dauphin of France (1785-1795)
  King Louis XVIII of France (1755-1824)
  King Charles X of France (1757-1836)
  Louis Antoine, Duke of Angoulême (1775-1844)
 Charles Ferdinand, Duke of Berry (1778-1820)
  Henri, Count of Chambord (1820-1883)
 King Philip V of Spain (1683-1746)
 King Charles III of Spain (1716-1788)
 King Charles IV of Spain (1748-1819)
 Infante Carlos, Count of Molina (1788-1855)
  Infante Juan, Count of Montizón (1822-1887)
  Infante Carlos, Duke of Madrid (1848-1909)
  Infante Jaime, Duke of Madrid (1870-1931)
  Infante Alfonso Carlos, Duke of San Jaime (1849-1936) 
 Infante Francisco de Paula (1794-1865)
 Francisco de Asís, Duke of Cádiz (1822-1902)
 King Alfonso XII of Spain (1857-1985)
  King Alfonso XIII of Spain (1886-1941)
  Infante Jaime, Duke of Segovia (1908-1975)
  Alfonso, Duke of Anjou and Cádiz (1936-1989)
  Louis Alphonse, Duke of Anjou (b. 1974)
 (1) Louis (b. 2010)
 (2) Alphonse (b. 2010)
 (3) Henri (b. 2019)
 Infante Juan, Count of Barcelona (1913-1993)
 (4) King Juan Carlos I of Spain (b. 1938)
 (5) King Felipe VI of Spain (b. 1968)
 Infante Enrique, Duke of Seville (1823-1870)
 Francisco de Paula de Borbón y Castellví (1853-1942)
 Francisco de Borbón y de la Torre (1882-1952)
 Francisco de Borbón y Borbón (1912-1995)
 (6) Francisco de Borbón y Escasany (b. 1943)
 (7) Francisco de Paula de Borbón y Hardenberg (b. 1979)
 (8) Alfonso Carlos de Borbón y Escasany (b. 1945)
 (9) Alfonso de Borbón y Yordi (b. 1973)
 (10) Enrique de Borbón y García de Lóbez (b. 1970)
 José María de Borbón y de la Torre (1883-1962)
 Carlos de Borbón y Rich (1915-1987)
 (11) Carlos Jose de Borbón y del Milagros de Oro (b. 1940)
 Alberto de Borbón y Rich (1916-1997)
 (12) Enrique de Borbón y Campos (b. 1948)
 Alberto de Borbón y Castellví (1854-1939)
 Alberto María de Borbón y d'Ast (1883-1959)
 Alfonso María de Borbón y Pintó (1909-1938)
 Alberto de Borbón y Pérez del Pulgar (1933-1995)
 (13) Alfonso de Borbón y Sánchez (b. 1961)
 (14) Alfonso de Borbón y Escrivá de Romaní (b. 1995)
 Alfonso de Borbón y Pérez del Pulgar (1937-2007)
 Alfonso de Borbón y Medina (1963-2005)
 (15) Alfonso Borbón y Pérez (b. 1999)
 (16) Fernando de Borbón y Medina (b. 1966)
 (17) Fernando de Borbón y Vallejo (b. 2001)
 (18) Ignacio de Borbón y Vallejo (b. 2005)
 (19) Jaime Santiago de Borbón y Medina (b. 1971)
 King Ferdinand I of the Two Sicilies (1751-1825)
 King Francis I of the Two Sicilies (1777-1830)
 King Ferdinand II of the Two Sicilies (1810-1859)
 Prince Alfonso, Count of Caserta (1841-1934)
 Prince Carlos of Bourbon-Two Sicilies (1870-1949)
 Infante Alfonso, Duke of Calabria (1901-1964)
 Infante Carlos, Duke of Calabria (1938-2015)
 (20) Prince Pedro, Duke of Calabria (b. 1968)
 (21) Prince Juan (b. 2003)
 (22) Prince Pablo (b. 2004)
 (23) Prince Pedro (b. 2007)
 Prince Ranieri, Duke of Castro (1883-1973)
 Prince Ferdinand, Duke of Castro (1926-2008)
 (24) Prince Carlo, Duke of Castro (b. 1963)
 Prince Philip of Bourbon-Two Sicilies (1885-1949)
 Prince Gaetano of Bourbon-Two Sicilies (1917-1884)
 (25) Adrian Philip de Bourbon (b. 1948)
 (26) Philip Charles de Bourbon (b. 1977)
 (27) Gregory Peter de Bourbon (b. 1950)
 (28) Christan Peter de Bourbon (b. 1974)
 (29) Alexander de Bourbon 
 (30) Raymond Paul de Bourbon (b. 1978)
 (31) Andrew Jean de Bourbon
 Prince Gabriel of Bourbon-Two Sicilies (1897-1975)
 Prince Antoine of Bourbon-Two Sicilies (1929-2019)
 (32) Prince Francis of Bourbon-Two Sicilies (b. 1960)
 (33) Prince Antoine of Bourbon-Two Sicilies (b. 2003)
 (34) Prince Gennaro of Bourbon-Two Sicilies (b. 1966)
 (35) Prince Casimir of Bourbon-Two Sicilies (b. 1938)
 (36) Prince Louis of Bourbon-Two Sicilies (b. 1970)
 (37) Paulo Afonso di Borbone-Dos Sicilias (b. 2014)
 (38) Prince Alexander of Bourbon-Two Sicilies (b. 1974)
 Philip, Duke of Parma (1720-1765)
 Ferdinand I, Duke of Parma (1751-1802)
 King Louis I of Etruria (1773-1803)
 Charles II, Duke of Parma (1799-1883)
 Charles III, Duke of Parma (1823-1854)
 Robert I, Duke of Parma (1848-1907)
 Xavier, Duke of Parma (1889-1977)
 Carlos Hugo, Duke of Parma (1930-2010)
 (39) Prince Carlos Javier, Duke of Parma (b. 1970)
 (10) Prince Carlos Enrique of Bourbon-Parma (b. 2016)
 (41) Prince Jaime of Bourbon Parma (b. 1972)
 (42) Prince Sixtus Henry of Bourbon-Parma (b. 1940)
 Prince Felix of Bourbon-Parma (1893-1970)
 Grand Duke Jean of Luxembourg (1921-2019)
 (43) Grand Duke Henri of Luxembourg (b. 1955)
 (44) Guillaume, Hereditary Grand Duke of Luxembourg (b. 1981)
 (45) Prince Charles of Luxembourg (b. 2020)
 (46) Prince Felix of Luxembourg (b. 1984)
 (47) Prince Liam of Nassau (b. 2016)
 (48) Prince Louis of Luxembourg (b. 1986)
 (49) Prince Noah of Nassau (b. 2007)
 (50) Prince Sebastian of Luxembourg (b. 1992)
 (51) Prince Jean of Luxembourg (b. 1957)
 (52) Prince Constantin of Nassau (b. 1988)
 (53) Prince Félix of Nassau (b. 2018)
 (54) Prince Wenceslas of Nassau (b. 1990)
 (55) Prince Carl-Johan of Nassau (b. 1992)
 (56) Prince Xander of Nassau (b. 2021)
 (57) Prince Guillaume of Luxembourg (b. 1963)
 (58) Prince Paul Louis of Nassau  (b. 1998)
 (59) Prince Léopold of Nassau (b. 2000)
 (60) Prince Jean of Nassau(b. 2004)
 Prince Charles of Luxembourg (1927-1977)
 (61) Prince Robert of Luxembourg (b. 1968)
 (62) Prince Alexandre of Nassau (b. 1997)
 (63) Prince Frederik of Nassau (b. 2002)
 Prince René of Bourbon-Parma (1894-1962)
 Prince Jacques of Bourbon-Parma (1922-1964)
 (64) Philippe de Bourbon (b. 1949)
 (65) Jacques de Bourbon (b. 1986)
 (66) Joseph de Bourbon (b. 1989)
 (67) Alain Jean de Bourbon (b. 1955)
 Prince Michel of Bourbon-Parma (1926-2018)
 Prince Eric of Bourbon-Parma (1953-2021)
 (68) Prince Michel of Bourbon-Parma (b. 1989)
 (69) Prince Henri of Bourbon-Parma (b. 1991)
 (70) Prince Charles-Emmanuel of Bourbon-Parma (b. 1961)
 (71) Prince Amaury of Bourbon-Parma (b. 1991)
 Prince André of Bourbon-Parma (1928-2011)
 (72) Prince Axel of Bourbon-Parma (b. 1967)
 (73) Côme de Bourbon-Parme (b. 1997)
 Prince Louis of Bourbon-Parma (1899-1967)
 Prince Guy of Bourbon-Parma (1940-1991)
 (74) Louis de Bourbon (b. 1966)
 (75) Guy de Bourbon (b. 1995)
 (76) Prince Rémy of Bourbon-Parma (b. 1942)
 (77) Tristan Louis de Bourbon (b. 1974)
 (78) Imri Daniel de Bourbon (b. 2020)
 (79) Prince Jean of Bourbon-Parma (b. 1961)
 (80) Arnaud de Bourbon (b. 1989)
 (81) Christophe de Bourbon (b. 1991)

Electoral results 
These are the results for broadly Legitimist parties in French national elections.

See also 

 Bonapartism
 Bourbon Restoration
 Carlism
 France in the long nineteenth century
 French dynastic disputes
 Line of succession to the French throne (Legitimist-Orléanist)
 Loyalism
 Miguelist
 Orléanist
 Party of Order
 René Rémond
 Reactionary
 Royalist
 Succession to the French throne
 Ultra-royalists
 List of movements that dispute the legitimacy of a reigning monarch

References

External links 

 
Political parties established in 1814
Reactionary
French counter-revolutionaries
Conservatism in France
Monarchism in France
Rival successions
1814 establishments in France
Pretenders to the French throne
Conservative parties in France
Monarchist parties in France
Right-wing ideologies
Right-wing parties in France
Far-right politics in France
Catholic political parties
Political parties of the French Empire